The Artillery Peak mine is a mine located in the western United States, about  north of Alamo Lake in Mohave County, Arizona. Artillery Peak represents one of the largest manganese reserves in the United States, with estimated reserves of 159 million tons of manganese ore graded 3.9% manganese metal.

It is currently not in production. Alternate names are Artillery Mountain Mine and Hanna Mine.

References 

Manganese mines in the United States
Geography of Mohave County, Arizona